The 2018–19 season was Debreceni VSC's 41st competitive season, 26th consecutive season in the OTP Bank Liga and 116th year in existence as a football club.

First team squad 

Source:

Transfers

Summer

In:

Out:

Source:

Winter

In:

Out:

Source:

Competitions

Nemzeti Bajnokság I

League table

Results summary

Results by round

Matches

Hungarian Cup

Statistics

Appearances and goals
Last updated on 19 May 2019.

|-
|colspan="14"|Youth players:

|-
|colspan="14"|Players no longer at the club:

|}

Top scorers
Includes all competitive matches. The list is sorted by shirt number when total goals are equal.
Last updated on 19 May 2019

Disciplinary record
Includes all competitive matches. Players with 1 card or more included only.

Last updated on 19 May 2019

Overall
{|class="wikitable"
|-
|Games played || 42 (33 OTP Bank Liga and 9 Hungarian Cup)
|-
|Games won || 20 (14 OTP Bank Liga and 6 Hungarian Cup)
|-
|Games drawn || 10 (9 OTP Bank Liga and 1 Hungarian Cup)
|-
|Games lost || 12 (10 OTP Bank Liga and 2 Hungarian Cup)
|-
|Goals scored || 58
|-
|Goals conceded || 49
|-
|Goal difference || +9
|-
|Yellow cards || 106
|-
|Red cards || 1
|-
|rowspan="1"|Worst discipline ||  Ákos Kinyik (12 , 1 )
|-
|rowspan="2"|Best result || 3–0 (A) v Teskánd - Magyar Kupa - 31-10-2018
|-
| 4–1 (H) v Paks - Nemzeti Bajnokság I - 19-05-2019
|-
|rowspan="3"|Worst result || 0–3 (A) v Budapest Honvéd - Nemzeti Bajnokság I - 25-08-2018
|-
| 0–3 (A) v Kisvárda - Nemzeti Bajnokság I - 09-02-2019
|-
| 0–3 (H) v MOL Vidi - Magyar Kupa - 23-04-2019
|-
|rowspan="2"|Most appearances ||  Tamás Takács (39 appearances)
|-
|  Kevin Varga (39 appearances)
|-
|rowspan="2"|Top scorer ||  Tamás Takács (9 goals)
|-
|  Márk Szécsi (9 goals)
|-
|Points || 70/126 (55.56%)
|-

References

External links
 Official Website 
 UEFA
 fixtures and results

Debreceni VSC seasons
Debrecen